Walter Budeus (29 October 1902 – 21 August 1944) was a German communist and resistance fighter against Nazism.

Biography
Budeus was born in Zossen. He trained as a machine fitter, and joined the Communist Party of Germany (KPD) in 1931. After the Nazi Party came to power in 1933, Budeus was active in the underground communist resistance. In 1936, he set up an illegal resistance cell at the Deutsche Waffen und Munitionsfabriken factory where he worked, organizing more than 50 workers.

From the late 1930s, Budeus worked closely with the resistance group led by Robert Uhrig, distributing pamphlets, making contacts with other resistance fighters and collecting information on arms production and the political mood of the German population. On 4 February 1942, Budeus was arrested by the Gestapo. He was detained for more than two years in Sachsenhausen concentration camp and Brandenburg Prison before being sentenced to death by the People's Court on 7 June 1944. He was executed by guillotine on 21 August 1944 in Brandenburg-Görden Prison.

A street in the Friedrichsfelde locality of Berlin was named Walter-Budeus-Straße from 14 January 1976 until 1981.

References

1902 births
1944 deaths
Politicians from Brandenburg
Communist Party of Germany politicians
Communists in the German Resistance
Executed communists in the German Resistance
People condemned by Nazi courts
People executed by Nazi Germany by guillotine
People from Brandenburg executed by Nazi Germany
Sachsenhausen concentration camp prisoners
People from Teltow-Fläming